EISD may refer to:
 Eanes Independent School District 
 Early Independent School District
 Eastland Independent School District
 Ector Independent School District
 Edcouch-Elsa Independent School District
 Edgewood Independent School District (Bexar County, Texas)
 Edgewood Independent School District (Van Zandt County, Texas)
 Edna Independent School District
 Electra Independent School District
 Elgin Independent School District
 Elkhart Independent School District
 Ennis Independent School District
 Era Independent School District
 Etoile Independent School District
 Eula Independent School District
 Eustace Independent School District
 Evadale Independent School District 
 Evant Independent School District
 Everman Independent School District 
 Enterprise Information Security Department Bank Saudi Fransi KSA
 Excelsior Independent School District
 Ezzell Independent School District